Gustaf Adolf Sellin was a Swedish nordic combined skier who competed in the 1930s. He won a silver medal in the individual event at the 1939 FIS Nordic World Ski Championships in Zakopane.

References

External links

Swedish male Nordic combined skiers
Year of birth missing
Year of death missing
FIS Nordic World Ski Championships medalists in Nordic combined